The Tajik–Afghan bridge at Tem-Demogan was opened on 3 November 2002. It spans the Panj River. It was the first of four bridges planned to be built with the assistance of the Aga Khan Foundation.

Tem is a microdistrict of Khorugh, in Gorno-Badakhshan Autonomous Province, Tajikistan, which is very sparsely settled. Many of the inhabitants there are Ismaili muslims, followers of the Aga Khan.

Demogan is a location in Afghanistan.

The bridge cost $400,000.

See also 
Tajikistan–Afghanistan bridge at Panji Poyon
Tajik–Afghan Friendship Bridge

References

Suspension bridges in Tajikistan
Suspension bridges in Afghanistan
Afghanistan–Tajikistan border crossings
Bridges completed in 2002
2002 establishments in Tajikistan
2002 establishments in Afghanistan
Road bridges in Afghanistan